The Lonoke Confederate Monument is located in central downtown Lonoke, Arkansas, on the grounds of the Lonoke County Courthouse. The soldier holds a rifle, its butt resting on the ground, and carries a bedroll. He has a belt on which there are a canteen and bayonet. The statue was commissioned by the local chapter of the United Daughters of the Confederacy and was unveiled in 1910.

The monument was listed on the National Register of Historic Places in 1996.

See also
National Register of Historic Places listings in Lonoke County, Arkansas

References

Buildings and structures in Lonoke, Arkansas
Confederate States of America monuments and memorials in Arkansas
Historic district contributing properties in Arkansas
Monuments and memorials on the National Register of Historic Places in Arkansas
National Register of Historic Places in Lonoke County, Arkansas
Neoclassical architecture in Arkansas
1910 establishments in Arkansas